Macrospondylus is an extinct genus of machimosaurid teleosauroid crocodyliform from the Early Jurassic (Toarcian) of Europe. Fossils are known from the Posidonia Shale of Germany, the Whitby Mudstone of the United Kingdom, and the "schistes bitumineux" of Luxembourg.

Evolutionary relationships

Macrospondylus has historically been synonymized with Steneosaurus. A 2005 phylogenetic analysis of Thalattosuchia, however, did not support the monophyly of Steneosaurus, as the genera Machimosaurus and Teleosaurus both fell within Steneosaurus. Reinforcing the paraphyly of Steneosaurus, Young et al. (2012), Ősi et al. (2018), and Wilberg et al. (2019) recovered Steneosaurus bollensis and other Steneosaurus species in disparate positions within Teleosauridae.

In 2020, the genus was formally revived.

See also

 List of marine reptiles

References

Prehistoric pseudosuchian genera
Prehistoric marine crocodylomorphs
Early Jurassic crocodylomorphs
Fossil taxa described in 1830
Early Jurassic reptiles of Europe
Thalattosuchians